Bisilliat is a surname. Notable people with the surname include:

 Louis Bisilliat (1931–2010), French cyclist
 Maureen Bisilliat (born 1931), Brazilian photographer